Route 135 is a Connecticut state highway running entirely in the town of Fairfield. It connects U.S. Route 1 in downtown Fairfield to Route 58 in the northern part of town.

Route description
Route 135 begins as North Benson Road at an intersection with US 1 in downtown Fairfield and heads north, intersecting I-95 at southbound Exit 22 about  later. Route 135 continues north, passing by Fairfield University, then turns right onto Stillson Road. It then heads northeast for another  until it ends at an intersection with Route 58. Route 135 is two lanes wide and is classified as a minor arterial road for its entire length. It carries traffic volumes of about 14,600 per day.

History
Modern Route 135 was created at an undetermined time between 1943 and 1953. It was established as a route from the Fairfield Business District to the Merritt Parkway and points north via Route 58. Prior to the creation of modern Route 135, an earlier Route 135 was established in 1932 in the Greater Waterbury area, which has since been absorbed into modern Route 188.

Major intersections

References

Transportation in Fairfield County, Connecticut
135
Fairfield, Connecticut
1953 establishments in Connecticut